Jigo may refer to:

Jigo (Go), a tied score in the game of Go
A character in Princess Mononoke
 Jigō, a name in common use for Buddhist temples in Japan